Secondary High School, Hiregutti is a high school in the Uttar Kannada district of India.

The former headmasters
  M. A. Bhatta

High schools and secondary schools in Karnataka
Schools in Uttara Kannada district